Ryan Ian Hok-A-Hin (born 11 July 1997) is a Sint Maartener international footballer who plays as a defender for Dutch amateur side FC Horst Ermelo and the Sint Maarten national football team.

Career statistics

International

References

External links
 Ryan Hok-A-Hin at CaribbeanFootballDatabase

1997 births
Living people
Association football defenders
Dutch Antillean footballers
Dutch Antillean expatriate footballers
Sint Maarten international footballers
VVOG players
AFC Ajax players
Expatriate footballers in the Netherlands